Manito Mitchell Airport  is a privately owned, formerly-public-use airport in Tazewell County, Illinois, United States. It is located three nautical miles (3.5 mi, 5.6 km) north of the central business district of Manito, a village in Mason County. The airport has been converted to a private-use airport known as Palmer Flying Service Airport.

Facilities and aircraft 
It has two runways: 4/22 is 2,784 by 40 feet (849 x 12 m) with an asphalt pavement; 18/36 is 2,188 by 40 feet (667 x 12 m) with an asphalt and turf surface.

For the 12-month period ending December 31, 2009, the airport had 6,000 aircraft operations, an average of 16 per day: 97% general aviation and 3% military. At that time there were 12 single-engine aircraft based at this airport.

References

External links 
 Aerial photo as of 14 April 1998 from USGS The National Map

Airports in Illinois
Transportation buildings and structures in Tazewell County, Illinois